Fuzz is the debut studio album by native Californian band Fuzz. released on October 1, 2013, by In the Red Records. The album features a traditional heavy metal and hard rock sound in the vein of Blue Cheer, High Tide, Black Sabbath, and Deep Purple

Track listing

Personnel
Roland Cosio - bass, harmony on "What's in My Head"
Ty Segall - drums / lead vocals
Charles Moothart - guitar, main vocals on "Raise"
Recording, mixing & wizardry : Chris Woodhouse, May 25–31, 2013 @ The Dock, Sacramento, CA.
Cover Art by Tatiana Kartomten
Photos by Denee Petracek

References

Fuzz (band) albums
2013 albums
In the Red Records albums